The Guaiquerí-class patrol vessels (Avante 2200 Combatant) are a class of ocean patrol vessels or POVZEE (Spanish: Patrullero Oceánico de Vigilancia de la Zona Económica Exclusiva) in Venezuelan Navy service. The lead ship were originally intended to have the pennant F-31 and name of Guaicaipuro but has since been renumbered.

Design
The POVZEE vessels feature stealth technology with reduced radar and infrared signatures as well as special design to minimize the propulsion system's noise emissions and vibrations. An aft hangar and flight deck enables operation of a single rotary-wing aircraft. The ship carries two small semi-rigid boats RHIB for rescue and transport purposes.

The first ship, Guaiquerí was launched by Spanish state-owned shipbuilder, Navantia, at their Cadiz shipyard on 24 June 2009.

On 3 August 2012, Warao grounded on a reef off Fortaleza, Brazil when arriving for the joint exercise "VenBras-2012" with the Brazilian Navy.  She was assisted by sister Kariña and refloated by Brazilian tugboats. The hull and propulsion system were heavily damaged and it was decided to repair her in Brazil with assistance from Navantia. In March 2013 she arrived at the naval dockyard at Rio de Janeiro aboard Dutch heavy-lift dock Rolldock Sea.

On 31 March 2016, the accidental discharge of a cannon on Guaiquerí left at least one dead and six injured.

Ships of class

References

External links
 Deagel POVZEE
 POVZEE Offshore Patrol Vessel
 Navantia Launches and Commissions Two OPVs to Venezuelan Navy

Ships of the Bolivarian Navy of Venezuela
Patrol ship classes